Bolma midwayensis is a species of sea snail, a marine gastropod mollusk in the family Turbinidae, the turban snails.

Description
The size of the shell varies between 25 mm and 30 mm

Distribution
This species occurs in the Pacific Ocean off Midway Island.

References

External links
 To Encyclopedia of Life
 To World Register of Marine Species
 

midwayensis
Gastropods described in 1970